Lee Hyeong-geun (born 7 December 1964) is a South Korean weightlifter. He competed in the men's light heavyweight event at the 1988 Summer Olympics, winning the bronze medal.

References

1964 births
Living people
South Korean male weightlifters
Olympic weightlifters of South Korea
Weightlifters at the 1988 Summer Olympics
Place of birth missing (living people)
Olympic bronze medalists for South Korea
Olympic medalists in weightlifting
Medalists at the 1988 Summer Olympics
Asian Games medalists in weightlifting
Weightlifters at the 1990 Asian Games
Asian Games silver medalists for South Korea
Medalists at the 1990 Asian Games
20th-century South Korean people
21st-century South Korean people